The French submarine Z was an experimental submarine built for the French Navy between 1902 and 1905. It was laid down in April 1902, launched in March 1904 and completed in 1905. Designed by Gabriel Maugas, Z was essentially an experimental submarine and it was the first French submarine to be commissioned with a diesel engine although  was the first to be launched.

Design

She was the first French submarine ordered to have a diesel engine for surface running. Her complement was 16 men. 

Her armament comprised two  bow torpedo tubes.

Construction and career
Z was a single hull design by Gabriel Maugas as an improved . The French admiralty has not yet chosen the type to be built, and both Z and  appeared on 18 July 1904 at Cherbourg for comparison tests before a special commission. Aigrette was chosen and Z was not adopted for a class order.

Z was ordered on 10 June 1901 and laid down in the Arsenal de Rochefort on 1 April 1902. It was launched on 28 March 1904 and commissioned on 3 June 1904. It was the first submarine to be ordered and commissioned with a diesel engine for surface running, although  was the first to be launched. Z received the pennant number Q 36 at its commissioning and cost 779,300 Francs.

Z operated in the Mediterranean Sea until 9 March 1910, when she was struck from the Navy list.

See also 

List of submarines of France

References

Bibliography

 
 

1904 ships
Experimental submarines